Xigalo is a small town on the R81 route, falling under the Collins Chabane Local Municipality in the Limpopo province of South Africa.

Xigalo is famed for being the birthplace of the South African potter and sculptor Noria Muelwa Mabasa.

References

Populated places in the Thulamela Local Municipality